Stewart v Moray Council [2006] ICR 1253 (EAT) is a UK labour law case, concerning the information and consultation in the European Union.

Facts
500 employees of Moray Council made a request for an I&C procedure. This was over 10 per cent of the employees, but not 40 per cent. Moray Council claimed that it did not need an I&C procedure, because there was already a collective agreement with a protocol about information and consultation with the union. Moray Council demanded a ballot with a 40 per cent threshold under ICER 2004 regulation 8(1) voting. Stewart argued the collective agreement did not provide for representation of non-union employees and had not been endorsed by all employees, so the collective agreement was not a ‘pre-existing agreement’ under regulation 8(1).

The Central Arbitration Committee decided that the pre-existing agreement did not comply with all requirements because although a majority of employees were union members, one of the recognition agreements was unclear about when consultation would take place. The agreement relating to school teachers failed to set out how the employer gave information to employees or their representatives or sought views on information under regulation 8(1)(d).

Judgment
The Employment Appeal Tribunal upheld. The employer was required to negotiate for an information and consultation procedure. ICER 2004 do not prescribe any way that an employee approval is to be demonstrated for a pre-existing agreement. This contrasts to negotiated agreements under reg 16. Elias J said the following.

See also

UK labour law
Codetermination

Notes

References

United Kingdom labour case law